Scolioplecta comptana is a species of moth of the family Tortricidae. It is found in Australia in  Queensland and New South Wales.

References

Moths described in 1863
Phricanthini